The Card Player (Italian: Il cartaio) is a 2004 giallo film directed by Dario Argento. The film stars Stefania Rocca and Liam Cunningham and is Argento's second giallo feature of the decade (following Sleepless).

The film features a brief role by Fiore Argento, the director's eldest daughter. She had previously appeared in her father's films Phenomena and Demons.

Plot 

The film centers around a serial killer known as "The Card Player", who is kidnapping young women in Rome. Using a webcam set-up, the killer challenges the police by forcing them to play hands of Internet poker. If the police lose, the kidnapped victim is tortured and murdered on-screen. When a British tourist is among the girls murdered, policeman John Brennan (Cunningham) is assigned the case and quickly teams up with Italian detective Anna Mari (Rocca). The duo have their work cut out for them when the Police Chief's daughter (Argento) becomes the killer's latest kidnapping victim.

Cast

Stefania Rocca as Anna Mari
Liam Cunningham as John Brennan
Silvio Muccino as Remo 
Adalberto Maria Merli as the Police Commissioner
Fiore Argento as Lucia Marini 
Cosimo Fusco as Berardelli 
Mia Benedetta as Francesca
Giovanni Visentin as C.I.D. Chief
 Vera Gemma as Third Victim

Production 

Originally conceived as a sequel to the director's own The Stendhal Syndrome to be titled In the Dark, the film was rewritten when that film's star, Asia Argento, declined to be involved. The setting was changed from Venice to Rome to bring costs down and recapture the feel of Argento's early giallo, The Bird with the Crystal Plumage. The director said: "My fans love it when I shoot in Rome. The city is the most wonderful film set ever, like a dusty museum with its cocktail of rundown buildings and beautiful open spaces."

Release 

The film was released in Italy in January 2004. In the United States, following a small number of cinema screenings, it was released on DVD by Anchor Bay Entertainment later that year. The film premiered on DVD in the UK in October 2004, after receiving a 15 certificate from the BBFC.

Critical reception 

The Card Player received a negative response from critics. The film has an approval rating of 20% on movie review aggregator website Rotten Tomatoes, based on ten reviews. The New York Times wrote, "The Card Player [...] doesn't break the unhappy streak of his [Argento's] later films. Though it's based on a promisingly outrageous premise [...] the film unfolds as a tired, thoroughly conventional police procedural that might as well be titled CSI: Roma." AllMovie's review was unfavorable, writing, "The Card Player offers a fair amount of suspense and at least one memorable set piece, but for those even remotely familiar with Argento's canon, there's the feeling that it's all been done before – and handled with much more style and confidence." Maitland McDonagh also gave the film a negative review, criticizing the screenplay for being "perfunctory" and for going "to so little trouble to hide the killer's identity that even inattentive viewers will know who's to blame long before the police figure it out."

References

External links 

 

2004 films
2000s serial killer films
2000s Italian-language films
2004 horror films
Films set in Rome
Giallo films
Films scored by Claudio Simonetti
Police detective films
Films directed by Dario Argento
Italian serial killer films
2000s mystery films
2004 crime thriller films
Films with screenplays by Dario Argento
Films about snuff films
Films about gambling
2000s English-language films